Gelson Singh (born 1 February 1994) is an Indian cricketer. He made his first-class debut on 25 December 2019, for Manipur in the 2019–20 Ranji Trophy. He made his List A debut on 27 February 2021, for Manipur in the 2020–21 Vijay Hazare Trophy.

References

External links
 

1994 births
Living people
Indian cricketers
Manipur cricketers
Place of birth missing (living people)